Alicia Furletti-Blomberg (born 1989) is a Canadian ball hockey player and member of the Canadian national ball hockey team. She is a three-time Ball Hockey World Championship gold medalist with the Canadian team, winning in 2013, 2015 and 2022. During 2012 to 2015, Blomberg competed in the women's division of Red Bull Crashed Ice, capturing a bronze medal in 2014.

A former ice hockey player, her college ice hockey career was played at the Canadian Interuniversity Sport (CIS) level with the Ottawa Gee Gees women's ice hockey program.

Playing career

CIS
Blomberg's final appearance with the Gee-Gees took place on March 31, 2013 as the Gee-Gees took on the Czech Republic women's national ice hockey team in an exhibition game in Rockland, Ontario, prior to the Czechs participating in the 2013 IIHF Women's World Championship in nearby Ottawa. The final score was a 6-3 loss to the visiting Czechs.

Ball hockey
As a member of the Canada women's national ball hockey team, Blomberg has captured two world championship gold medals in her career. Her first appearance for Canada was at the 2013 ISBHF World Championships in St. John's, Newfoundland.

Returning to the Canadian team in 2015, she contributed towards Canada going undefeated in the tournament, claiming the gold medal for the second consecutive time. In the gold medal game against the Czech Republic, Blomberg logged a goal and a pair of assists in the 5-1 final. For her efforts, she was recognized as Canada's Player of the Game. Blomberg tied fellow Canadian Jessie McCann for eighth in tournament scoring, logging five goals and three assists in seven games played.

Red Bull Crashed Ice
Having competed in the Red Bull Crashed Ice competitions from 2012 to 2015, Blomberg achieved a podium finish in 2014, capturing the bronze medal in the world championships. Salla Kyhala of Finland captured the gold medal while fellow Canadian Jacqueline Legere won the silver medal.

Awards and honours
Best Forward, 2013 ISBHF Worlds
2013 Ottawa Sports Awards, Individual Sport Award Winner: Ball Hockey
2013 University of Ottawa Sports Services President's Award (recognizing outstanding athletic, academic, and community achievement) 
2015 CBHA Nationals, All-Star Team Selection
Best Forward, 2015 ISBHF Worlds
All-Tournament Team Selection, 2017 Ball Hockey World Championship

References

1989 births
Living people
Ball hockey players
Canadian women's ice hockey forwards
Ice hockey people from Ontario
Ottawa Gee-Gees women's ice hockey players
Sportspeople from Timmins
University of Ottawa alumni